The albums discography of American country artist, George Jones contains 80 studio albums, 132 compilation albums, three live albums, ten video albums and seven box sets. Of his studio albums, 69 are solo releases while 11 are collaborative releases (not counting his music with Tammy Wynette). In 1956, Jones's debut studio LP was issued on Starday Records titled, Grand Ole Opry's New Star. The label only issued one studio effort, but would release a series of compilation. On Mercury Records, Jones released six studio LP's including Country Church Time (1959) and George Jones Salutes Hank Williams (1960). He switched to the United Artists label in 1962, where he released 13 studio LP's. Among these was a collaborative LP with Melba Montgomery called What's in Our Hearts (1963), which was his first to chart the Billboard Top Country Albums survey. He moved to Musicor in 1965. Among the label's studio LP's was I'm a People (1966), which reached the top of the Billboard country survey. Musicor also issued his first collaborative studio album with Gene Pitney, which made the Billboard country LP's chart and the Billboard 200.

The Musicor label issued a series of compilations during the sixties and seventies, including five which charted on Billboard. Jones moved to Epic Records in 1972. The label released 11 studio albums by Jones in the seventies. His highest-charting was A Picture of Me (Without You) (1973), which reached number three on the Billboard country albums survey. I Am What I Am (1980) reached the country albums top ten and the Billboard 200. It also became his first disc to certify platinum in the United States, for selling over million copies. Among his eighties albums, Still the Same Ole Me (1981), Shine On (1983), Who's Gonna Fill Their Shoes (1984) and Wine Colored Roses (1986), all made the Billboard country top ten. Still the Same Ole Me and Wine Colored Roses both certified gold in the United States for selling 500,000 copies each. Epic released a series of compilations during the eighties. Among them was Super Hits, which sold two million copies in the United States. Jones also collaborated on studio discs with Johnny Paycheck and Merle Haggard respectively during the eighties. He remained on Epic Records until 1991's You Oughta Be Here with Me.

Jones switched to MCA Records and released Walls Can Fall in 1992, which also certified gold in the United States. Among his other studio albums of the decade, High-Tech Redneck (1994) and Cold Hard Truth (1999) also certified gold in the United States. The latter album was his first with Asylum Records. His second Asylum release was the live disc, Live with the Possum (1999). A variety of labels issued compilations during the nineties. His 1998 compilation, 16 Biggest Hits certified gold in the United States. Jones released his final studio albums in the 2000s. Most of these releases were issued on Bandit Records. Among them was The Rock: Stone Cold Country 2001 and two albums that featured duet recordings. Bandit also issued several compilations, including the gold disc, 50 Years of Hits (2004). He also collaborated with Merle Haggard in 2006 on the charting disc, Kickin' Out the Footlights...Again. A posthumous disc was released in 2017 titled George Jones & The Smoky Mountain Boys.

Studio albums

1950s

1960s

1970s

1980s

1990s

2000s–2010s

As a collaborative artist

Compilation albums

1950s

1960s

1970s

1980s

1990s

2000s

2010s

Live albums

Box sets

Video albums

See also
George Jones singles discography

References

External links
 George Jones releases at Discogs
 George Jones discography at AllMusic

Country music discographies
Discographies of American artists